Gulf University (GU) is a private university located in Sanad, Bahrain. The university was established on 17 September 2001, licensed by the Bahraini Ministry of Education. The university is also an officially licensed testing center for SAT, GRE, PMI.

Colleges
The colleges at Gulf University offer undergraduate programs:

 College of Administration and Financial Science
 College of Computer Engineering and Sciences
 College of Engineering
 College of Law

Other Centers, Units & Offices at GU:
 Student Affairs Office
 Center for E-Learning
 English Language Development Center (ELDU)
 Professional Certification and Consultation Center (PCCC)
 Quality Assurance Center
 Community Service Directorate

References

External links 
 GU website

Educational institutions established in 2001
Universities in Bahrain
2001 establishments in Bahrain